A stream bed or streambed is the bottom of a stream or river (bathymetry) or the physical confine of the normal water flow (channel).  The lateral confines or channel margins are known as the stream banks or river banks, during all but flood stage. Under certain conditions a river can branch from one stream bed to multiple stream beds. A flood occurs when a stream overflows its banks and flows onto its flood plain. As a general rule, the bed is the part of the channel up to the normal water line, and the banks are that part above the normal water line. However, because water flow varies, this differentiation is subject to local interpretation.  Usually, the bed is kept clear of terrestrial vegetation, whereas the banks are subjected to water flow only during unusual or perhaps infrequent high water stages and therefore might support vegetation some or much of the time.

The nature of any stream bed is always a function of the flow dynamics and the local geologic materials, influenced by that flow. With small streams in mesophytic regions, the nature of the stream bed is strongly responsive to conditions of precipitation runoff. Where natural conditions of either grassland or forest ameliorate peak flows, stream beds are stable, possibly rich, with organic matter and exhibit minimal scour. These streams support a rich biota. Where conditions produce unnatural levels of runoff, such as occurs below roads, the stream beds will exhibit a greater amount of scour, often down to bedrock and banks may be undercut. This process greatly increases watershed erosion and results in thinner soils, upslope from the stream bed, as the channel adjusts to the increase in flow. The stream bed is very complex in terms of erosion. Sediment is transported, eroded and deposited on the stream bed. The majority of sediment washed out in floods is "near-threshold" sediment that has been deposited during normal flow and only needs a slightly higher flow to become mobile again. This shows that the stream bed is left mostly unchanged in size and shape.

Beds are usually what would be left once a stream is no longer in existence; the beds are usually well preserved even if they get buried, because the walls and canyons made by the stream usually have hard walls, usually soft sand and debris fill the bed. Dry stream beds are also subject to becoming underground water pockets (buried stream beds only) and flooding by heavy rains and water rising from the ground and may sometimes be part of the rejuvenation of the stream.

See also
 Armor (hydrology)
 Benthic zone
 Hyporheic zone
 Thalweg

References

External links
 

Water streams
Fluvial landforms
Limnology
Riparian zone
Freshwater ecology